Shoot Ogawa (born 1975) is a magician from Tokyo, Japan 
He has been interested in magic from the age of 10. Ogawa has been featured on television in Japan and is a corporate entertainer.

Some of his most renowned tricks include the Ninja Rings and the Muscle Pass which he introduced to American magicians and helped make famous.  In Feb 2008, he introduced his "Laws of Attraction" illusion to the Blackpool Magic Convention to an exclusive audience of professional magicians.

Ogawa was named the 2008 Parlour Magician of the Year by Media:Hollywood Magic Castle's Academy of Magical Arts.  
Previously, he was awarded Closeup Magician of the Year in 2003 and 2006, which is even more remarkable considering 2003 was his first year in America, and Ogawa spoke very little English.  Ogawa also won 1st place at the close-up competition in the MacMillan International Convention in 2002.

He has been featured on the cover of the Magic Magazine March 2003 issue. He has also appeared on "After Dark At The Magic Castle."

Awards
1993 Midwest Magic Jubilee(St. Louis) Grand Prix
2002 International Magic Convention（London）Grand Prix
2003 Magician of the Year 2002（Close-Up Category）
2006 Magician of the Year 2005（Close-Up Category）
2007 FFFF World Magic Convention MVP Award
2008 Magician of the Year 2007（Parlour Category）
2009 Magician of the Year 2008（Parlour Category）
2016 Magician of the Year 2015（Stage Category）
2018 Magician of the Year 2017（Stage Category）

References

External links
www.holyshoot.com - Personal web site

Japanese magicians
1975 births
Living people
People from Tokyo
Academy of Magical Arts Close-Up Magician of the Year winners
Academy of Magical Arts Parlour Magician of the Year winners
Academy of Magical Arts Stage Magician of the Year winners